Events from the year 1753 in Ireland.

Incumbent
Monarch: George II

Events
Renewed dispute over revenue surplus.
15 December – Lady Charlotte Cavendish, married to William Cavendish, 4th Duke of Devonshire (future Prime Minister of Great Britain & Ireland), inherits her family's estates, including Lismore Castle, from her father, Richard Boyle, 4th Earl of Cork, bringing them into the Devonshire family.

Publications
Charles O'Conor – Dissertations on the Ancient History of Ireland.

Births
16 November – James McHenry, signer of the United States Constitution from Maryland, third United States Secretary of War (died 1816)
22 November – Richard John Uniacke, lawyer, politician, member of Nova Scotia Legislative Assembly and Attorney General of Nova Scotia (died 1830)
Gilbert Austin, educator, clergyman and author (died 1837)
John Barrett, clergyman and Hebrew scholar (died 1821)

Deaths
11 January – Hans Sloane, physician and collector (born 1660)
14 January – George Berkeley, also known as Bishop Berkeley, philosopher and writer (born 1685)

References

 
Years of the 18th century in Ireland
Ireland
1750s in Ireland